Pterothominx is a genus of nematodes belonging to the family Capillariidae.

The species of this genus are found in North America.

Species:

Pterothominx hirudinis 
Pterothominx meleagrisgallopavo 
Pterothominx neopulchra 
Pterothominx pulchra 
Pterothominx sadovskoi 
Pterothominx totani

References

Nematodes